These hits topped the Ultratop 50 in 2021.

See also
 List of number-one albums of 2021 (Belgium)
 2021 in music

References

Ultratop 50
Belgium Ultratop 50
2021